This is a list of political parties in the United Kingdom, by their historic representation in elected bodies.

British House of Commons

London Assembly

British House of Lords

Northern Ireland Assembly

Scottish Parliament

Welsh Parliament

European Parliament

See also
 Timeline of political parties in the United Kingdom
 List of political parties in the United Kingdom
 List of political parties in the United Kingdom opposed to austerity
 Political make-up of local councils in the United Kingdom
 List of political parties by country
 Politics of the United Kingdom
 Political party affiliation in the United Kingdom
 Elections in the United Kingdom
 List of political parties in Northern Ireland
 List of political parties in Scotland
 List of political parties in Wales
 List of political parties in the Isle of Man (a British Crown dependency)
 List of political parties in Gibraltar (a British overseas territory)
 Index of UK party meta attributes

References
F. W. S. Craig, British Electoral Facts: 1832-1987
United Kingdom election results - summary results 1885-1979